Strijdompark, also called Strydompark, is a suburb of Johannesburg, South Africa. It is located in Region B of the City of Johannesburg Metropolitan Municipality.  It is named for J. G. Strijdom.

References

Johannesburg Region B